Archibald Lang (c. 1860 – 23 January 1925) was a Scottish footballer who played as a defender.

Career
Lang played club football for Dumbarton and made one appearance for Scotland in 1880.  He was also selected to play in 4 international trial matches for Scotland between 1878 and 1880.

References

External links
SFA profile
Archibald Lang (London Hearts Profile)
Archibald Lang (Dumbarton Football Club Historical Archive)

1860 births
1925 deaths
Scottish footballers
Scotland international footballers
Dumbarton F.C. players
Association football defenders
Date of birth missing
Place of birth missing
Place of death missing